George Parker may refer to:
 George Parker (astrologer) (1654–1743), English almanac maker
 Sir George Parker, 2nd Baronet (c. 1673–1727), English politician, MP
 George Parker (Royal Navy officer) (1767–1847), Royal Navy Admiral
 George C. Parker (1860–1936), American fraudster
 George Parker (cricketer) (1899–1969), South African cricketer
 George Parker, 2nd Earl of Macclesfield (c. 1695–1764), astronomer
 George Parker, 4th Earl of Macclesfield (1755–1842), British peer and politician
 George Parker, 7th Earl of Macclesfield (1888–1975), British peer and landowner
 George Parker (racewalker) (1897–1974), Australian athlete
 George Parker (MP) (1619–1673), English landowner and politician who sat in the House of Commons in 1659 and 1660
 George D. Parker (1873–1937), American-born actor, writer and director
 George Howard Parker (1864–1955), American zoologist
 George Parker (New Zealand politician) (1839–1915), New Zealand politician
 George Swinnerton Parker (1866–1952), founder of Parker Brothers
 George Safford Parker (1863–1937), American inventor and industrialist
 George Wells Parker (1882–1931), African American political activist
 George M. Parker (general) (1889–1968), Major general of the United States Army
 George Parker (footballer) (1921–2002), Australian rules footballer
 George G. C. Parker, American economist
 George Parker (squash player) (born 1996), English squash player
 George P. Parker (1885–1937), Attorney General of Utah
 George Lane Parker (1724–1791), British Army officer and politician

See also
 Georgie Parker (born 1964), Australian actress
 Georgie Parker (field hockey) (born 1989), Australian field hockey player
 George Parker Bidder (1806–1878), English engineer and calculating prodigy
George Parker Bidder III (1863-1954), British marine biologist
George Parker Bidder Jr. (1836 - 1896), British barrister
 George Parker Winship (1871–1952), American librarian and author